John Ignatius Fitzgerald (July 18, 1882 – December 16, 1966) was an American attorney who served in the Massachusetts General Court and on the Boston City Council. He was the Democratic nominee for the United States Senate in 1948.

Early life
Fitzgerald was born on July 18, 1882 in Boston. While in grammar school, his father died and Fitzgerald went to work as a newspaper boy. While still in his teens, Fitzgerald ran a cigar and newspaper store. In 1910 he began working as a contractor. He performed a significant amount of street work in the West End. Once he entered politics, Fitzgerald shifted from contracting to real estate. He also operated two of the city's busiest parking lots, located the near the Boston Garden/North Station.

Political career
At the age of 18, Fitzgerald was chosen by Martin Lomasney to serve as a precinct captain. In 1916, Fitzgerald represented the West End in the Massachusetts House of Representatives. He served in the Massachusetts Senate from 1917 to 1918. He returned to the House in 1919 and 1920 and again from 1923 to 1927.

From 1926 to 1939, Fitzgerald represented Ward 3 on the Boston City Council. He served as the council president from 1935 to 1937. He was defeated for reelection to the council by Joseph Russo. In 1941 he finished 5th in a Boston School Committee race where the top two candidates were elected. He ran for his old council seat in 1943, but lost to Russo 47% to 26%. In 1945, Fitzgerald was appointed Boston Fire Commissioner by acting mayor John E. Kerrigan.

In 1948, Fitzgerald ran for the United States Senate seat held by Leverett Saltonstall. He won the Democratic primary over four other candidates with 30% of the vote. Fitzgerald nearly pulled off an upset, but lost the general election to Saltonstall 53% to 46%. Fitzgerald ran again in 1954, but finished third in the primary behind Foster Furcolo and Joseph L. Murphy.

Later life and death
In November 1966, Fitzgerald gave up operating his parking lot near North Station. He was later confined him to his home after he fell and broken his arm. At midnight on December 16, 1966, Fitzgerald died of a heart attack at his home in the West End.

See also
 Massachusetts Senate's 2nd Suffolk district
 1916 Massachusetts legislature
 1917 Massachusetts legislature
 1918 Massachusetts legislature
 1919 Massachusetts legislature
 1920 Massachusetts legislature
 1923–1924 Massachusetts legislature
 1925–1926 Massachusetts legislature

References

1882 births
1966 deaths
20th-century American politicians
American real estate businesspeople
Boston City Council members
Commissioners of the Boston Fire Department
Democratic Party Massachusetts state senators
Democratic Party members of the Massachusetts House of Representatives